Ciboria rufofusca is a species of ascomycete fungus in the family Sclerotiniaceae. It occurs in Europe and in the Pacific Northwest region of North America, where it grows on fallen fir cones.

The caps are translucent brown cups growing from narrow stipes.

References

External links

Fungi described in 1873
Fungi of Europe
Fungi of North America
Sclerotiniaceae